Ab Barik-e Bala (also Romanized as Āb Bārīk-e Bālā; also known as Āb Bārīk) is a village in Bajestan Rural District, in the Central District of Bajestan County, Razavi Khorasan Province, Iran. At the 2006 census, its population was 81 in 22 families.

See also 
 List of cities, towns and villages in Razavi Khorasan Province

References 

Populated places in Bajestan County